Methyl-CpG-binding domain protein 4 is a protein that in humans is encoded by the MBD4 gene.

Structure

Human MBD4 protein has 580 amino acids with a methyl-CpG-binding domain at amino acids 82–147 and a C-terminal DNA glycosylase domain at amino acids 426–580.  These domains are separated by an intervening region that interacts with UHRF1, an E3 ubiquitin ligase, and USP7, a de-ubiquinating enzyme.

Function 

DNA methylation is the major modification of eukaryotic genomes and plays an essential role in mammalian development. Human proteins MECP2, MBD1, MBD2, MBD3, and MBD4 (this gene) comprise a family of nuclear proteins related by the presence in each of a methyl-CpG-binding domain (MBD). Each of these proteins, with the exception of MBD3, is capable of binding specifically to methylated DNA. MBD4 may function to mediate the biological consequences of the methylation signal. In addition, MBD4 has protein sequence similarity to bacterial DNA repair enzymes and thus may have some function in DNA repair. Further, MBD4 gene mutations are detected in tumors with primary microsatellite instability (MSI), a form of genomic instability associated with defective DNA mismatch repair, and MBD4 gene meets 4 of 5 criteria of a bona fide MIS target gene.

Deaminated bases as targets 

Bases in DNA decay spontaneously, and this decay includes hydrolytic deamination of purines and pyrimidines that contain an exocyclic amino group (see image). Hypoxanthine and xanthine are generated at a relatively slow rate by deamination of adenine and guanine, respectively.  However, deamination of pyrimidines occurs at a 50-fold higher rate of approximately 200–300 events per cell per day, and is potentially highly mutagenic. Deamination of cytosine (C) to uracil (U) and 5-methylcytosine (5mC) to thymine (T) generates G:U and G:T mismatches, respectively.  Upon DNA replication, these mismatches cause C to T transition mutations. Notably, for 5mC deamination, these mutations arise predominantly in the context of CpG sites.  The deamination rate of 5mC is approximately three times that of C.  MBD4 protein binds preferentially to fully methylated CpG sites and to their deamination derivatives G:U and G:T base pairs.  MBD4, which is employed in an initial step of base excision repair, specifically catalyzes the removal of T and U paired with guanine (G) within CpG sites.

Mutational importance of targets 

G:U and G:T mismatches, upon DNA replication, give rise to C to T transition mutations.  The mismatched U or T is usually removed by MBD4 before replication, thus avoiding mutation.  Alternatively, for G:T mismatches, the T may be removed by thymine-DNA glycosylase.  Mutations in the MBD4 gene (especially expansions/deletions in the polyadenine regions of the MBD4 gene) increase the genomic instability phenotype of a subset of MMR-defective tumors in mice, specifically contributing to elevated G:C to A:T transitions.

About 1/3 of all intragenic single base pair mutations in human cancers occur in CpG dinucleotides and are the result of C to T or G to A transitions.  These transitions comprise the most frequent mutations in human cancer.  For example, nearly 50% of somatic mutations of the tumor suppressor gene p53 in colorectal cancer are G:C to A:T transitions within CpG sites.

Clinical significance in cancer

Germline mutations of MBD4 

Germline mutations of MBD4 have been identified in acute myeloid leukemias, uveal melanomas, and glioblastomas. These cases presented an inactivation of the second allele of MBD4 in tumor and were associated with a subsequent very high mutation burden at CpG dinucleotides.

Somatic mutations of MBD4 

Mutation of MBD4 occurs in about 4% of colorectal cancers.  MBD4 mutations also occur in tumor samples of melanoma, ovarian, lung, esophageal and prostate cancers at frequencies between 0.5% and 8%.

MBD4 has a special relationship with DNA mismatch repair (MMR).  MBD4 protein binds strongly to the MMR protein MLH1.  A mutational deficiency in MBD4 causes down-regulation, at the protein level, of MMR proteins Mlh1, Msh2, Pms2, and Msh6 by 5.8-, 5.6-, 2.6-, and 2.7-fold, respectively.  In colorectal cancers with mutations in MMR genes, co-occurrence of MBD4 mutations were found in 27% of cancers.

Epigenetic silencing 

MBD4 mRNA expression is reduced in colorectal neoplasms due to methylation of the promoter region of MBD4. A majority of histologically normal fields surrounding the neoplastic growths also show reduced MBD4 mRNA expression (a field defect) compared to histologically normal tissue from individuals who never had a colonic neoplasm.  This indicates that an epigenetic deficiency in MBD4 expression is a frequent early event in colorectal tumorigenesis.

While other DNA repair genes, such as MGMT and MLH1, are often evaluated for epigenetic repression in many types of cancer, epigenetic deficiency of MBD4 is usually not evaluated, but might be of importance in such cancers as well.

Response to checkpoint inhibitors 

MBD4-associated hypermutated profile was shown to be associated with a tumor regression when a uveal melanoma patient was treated with a checkpoint inhibitor making these mutations potential biomarkers to treat cancers.

Interactions 

MBD4 has been shown to interact with MLH1 and FADD.

References

Further reading